Hoods Creek is a  long 1st order tributary to the Trent River in Craven County, North Carolina.

Course
Hoods Creek rises at Timothy Chapel, North Carolina and then flows north to join the Trent River about 1.5 miles southwest of James City.

Watershed
Hoods Creek drains  of area, receives about 55.1 in/year of precipitation, has a wetness index of 556.52, and is about 7% forested.

See also
List of rivers of North Carolina

References

Rivers of North Carolina
Rivers of Craven County, North Carolina